Curb Servin' is the second and final studio album from the hip hop group WC and the Maad Circle.<ref>{{Cite web|url=https://www.xxlmag.com/wc-and-the-maad-circle-drop-curb-servin-album-today-in-hip-hop/|title=WC and the Maad Circle Drop 'Curb Servin: Today in Hip-Hop - XXL|first=X. X. L.|last=Staff|website=XXL Mag}}</ref> The group disbanded the following year. Former member Coolio, who had embarked on a successful solo career, appeared on one track.Curb Servin' peaked at #85 on the Billboard 200, and #15 on Top R&B/Hip-Hop Albums.

Critical receptionTrouser Press'' compared the album to those of former member Coolio, writing that the combination of classic samples and hard rhymes made for an "unwieldy" and "uninventive" record.

Track listing

Samples
 "Intro"
 "Atomic Dog" by George Clinton
 "West Up!"
 "Reach For It" by George Duke
 "Everybody Loves the Sunshine" by Roy Ayers
 "Curb Servin'"
 "Dr. Funkenstein" by Parliament
 "Genius of Love" by Tom Tom Club
 "Feel Me"
 "(I Wanna Know) Do You Feel It" by Ohio Players
 "You Know How We Do It" by Ice Cube
 "Homesick"
 "Can't Stay Away" by Bootsy's Rubber Band
 "In A Twist"
 "Be Thankful For What You Got" by William DeVaughn
 "Aqua (A Psychoalphadiscobetabioaaquadoloop)" by Parliament
 "Kill a Habit"
 "Telephone Bill" by Johnny "Guitar" Watson
 "The Creator"
 "This Is For The Lover In You" by Shalamar
 "The One"
 "Girl Callin'" by Chocolate Milk

References

WC and the Maad Circle albums
1995 albums
Gangsta rap albums by American artists
G-funk albums